Burkina Faso participated at the 2017 Summer Universiade, in Taipei, Taiwan with 6  competitors from 2 sports.

Competitors
The following table lists Burkina Faso's delegation per sport and gender.

Athletics

Track Events

Field Events

Combined Events

Heptathlon

Judo

References

Nations at the 2017 Summer Universiade
2017 in Burkinabé sport
Burkina Faso at the Summer Universiade